George Llewellyn Krepp (21 July 1912 – 16 August 1973) was an Australian rules footballer who was highly successful in the West Australian National Football League (WANFL) playing for the Swan Districts Football Club.

Krepp played for Midland Districts in 1933 and was awarded the Cecil Bros. Medal for the best and fairest player in the association.

Picked up Swan Districts in 1934, Krepp played for most of the season. He was noted for his sharp turns and evasive maneuvers and precise kicking skills with both feet.

A speedy and rugged wingman, Krepp was one of Swan Districts' best players and won the club's fairest and best award three times.

As part of his excellent 1935 season Krepp also played for the state team which was defeated by the Victorian side by 13 points. Krepp shone on the wing and was one of the few centre-line players who outplayed his opponent. He was selected again to play for the state against South Australia later the same year.

He was the first Swan Districts player to win a Sandover Medal when he tied with Lou Daily from Subiaco in 1935.

He is named on the wing in the Swan Districts Team of the Century.

In 1936 Krepp was gain selected to play for his state against the South Australians. Western Australia lost the game by a single point with Krepp playing a good game until he was injured late in the game and was replaced by "Bluey" Matthews.

Krepp married Gladys Reid in 1939 in the Ross Memorial Church.

In 1940 Krepp was awarded the fairest and best in the Goldfields Football League winning with 24 votes, 10 more than the next best player. In 1941 Krepp announced he would be leaving to play for Saint Kilda Football Club in the Victorian Football League.

References

Swan Districts Football Club players
Sandover Medal winners
Boulder City Football Club players
Australian rules footballers from Western Australia
People from Boulder, Western Australia
1912 births
1973 deaths